Stockholm County or Region Stockholm held a regional council election on 9 September 2018 on the same day as the general and municipal elections.

Results

There were 149 seats, the same number as in 2014. The Social Democrats supplanted the Moderates as the largest party. However, after protracted negotiations, a majority Blue-Green government was formed between the Alliance parties and the Green Party. Previously, the Alliance parties had a majority since the 2014 regional elections, but losses to the Sweden Democrats necessitated the formation of a cross-bloc coalition with the Greens to gather a governing majority, as the Alliance parties wished to avoid relying on the Sweden Democrats.

Municipal & Stockholm ward results
Stockholm Municipality was divided into six separate electoral wards (Södermalm-Enskede, Bromma-Kungsholmen, Norrmalm-Östermalm-Gamla Stan, Östra Söderort, Västra Söderort and Yttre Västerort) and its results were not counted as a unit. These wards have in these lists been translated to English to shorten columns.

References

Elections in Stockholm County
Stockholm